Jean Ann Kennedy Smith (February 20, 1928June 17, 2020) was an American diplomat, activist, humanitarian, and author who served as United States Ambassador to Ireland from 1993 to 1998. She was a member of the Kennedy family, the eighth of nine children, and youngest daughter, born to Joseph P. Kennedy and Rose Fitzgerald. Her siblings included President John F. Kennedy, Senator Robert F. Kennedy, Senator Edward M. Kennedy, Rosemary Kennedy, and Special Olympics founder Eunice Kennedy Shriver. She was also a sister-in-law of Jacqueline Kennedy.

As Ambassador to Ireland, Smith was instrumental in the Northern Ireland peace process as President Bill Clinton's representative in Dublin. She was heavily criticized after urging the U.S. State Department to grant a visa to Sinn Féin President Gerry Adams, although her family said this step influenced the Provisional IRA in its declaration of a ceasefire in 1994. However, Adams has said it was President Clinton who led the Northern Ireland peace process, and that during the process, Smith relied on advice from an influential Belfast priest. President of Ireland Mary McAleese conferred honorary Irish citizenship on Smith in 1998, in recognition of her service to the country.

Smith was the founder of Very Special Arts (VSA), an internationally recognized non-profit organization dedicated to creating a society where people with disabilities can engage with the arts. In 2011, she was awarded the Presidential Medal of Freedom, the highest civilian honor in the United States, by President Barack Obama for her work with VSA and with people with disabilities.

Early years
Jean Ann Kennedy was born on February 20, 1928, at St. Margaret's Center for Women and Children in  the Dorchester section of Boston, Massachusetts, on her elder sister Kathleen's eighth birthday. Kennedy was the eighth of nine children born to Joseph P. Kennedy and Rose Kennedy. Her other siblings were Joseph P. Kennedy, Jr., U.S. President John F. Kennedy, Rose Marie Kennedy, Special Olympics founder Eunice Kennedy Shriver, Patricia Kennedy Lawford, U.S. Attorney General and U.S. Senator Robert F. Kennedy, and U.S. Senator Ted Kennedy. She has been described as having been the shyest and most guarded of the Kennedy children. She attended Manhattanville College (at the time a Society of the Sacred Heart school, and still located in Purchase, New York), where she befriended future sisters-in-law Ethel Skakel (who married Jean's older brother Robert in 1950) and Joan Bennett (who married Jean's younger brother Ted in 1958). Kennedy graduated from Manhattanville in 1949.

Career

Political involvement
Kennedy (known as Jean Kennedy Smith following her 1956 marriage to Stephen Edward Smith) was intricately involved with the political career of her older brother John. She worked on his 1946 congressional campaign, his 1952 Senate campaign, and, ultimately, his presidential campaign in 1960. She and her siblings helped John knock on doors in primary states such as Texas and Wisconsin, and on the campaign trail played the role of sister more than volunteer, citing her parents' family lesson of "working together for something".

Smith and her husband were present at The Ambassador Hotel in Los Angeles on June 5, 1968, during the assassination of her older brother Robert F. Kennedy, after he had won the 1968 California Democratic primary.

Very Special Arts
In 1974, Smith founded Very Special Arts, now known as the Department of VSA and Accessibility at the John F. Kennedy Center for the Performing Arts. VSA provides arts and education programming for youth and adults with disabilities. As of 2011, VSA's programs reportedly served "some 276,000 students in 43 states and 52 countries". Smith traveled extensively throughout the world on behalf of VSA to advocate for greater inclusion in the arts for people with disabilities. Her book, Chronicles of Courage: Very Special Artists, co-written with George Plimpton, was published by Random House in April 1993.

U.S. Ambassador to Ireland
In 1993, President Bill Clinton appointed Smith the U.S. Ambassador to Ireland, continuing a legacy of diplomacy begun by her father, who was the United States Ambassador to the United Kingdom during the administration of U.S. President Franklin D. Roosevelt. As ambassador, Smith played a pivotal role in the Northern Ireland peace process. As a demonstration of her ecumenical views, on at least one occasion, she received communion in a cathedral of the Church of Ireland, an autonomous province of the Anglican Communion.

President of Ireland Mary McAleese conferred honorary Irish citizenship on Smith in 1998, in recognition of her service to the country. During a ceremony, McAleese praised Smith's "fixedness of purpose". Irish Taoiseach (Prime Minister) Bertie Ahern told Smith, "You have helped bring about a better life for everyone throughout Ireland."

On July 4, 1998, about three months after the historic Good Friday Agreement of April 10, 1998, Smith retired as ambassador to Ireland.

Sinn Féin controversy
In 1994, Smith came to the forefront of American foreign policy when she championed the granting of a U.S. visa to Sinn Féin leader Gerry Adams. Smith was lauded for her work in the region, but was criticized for supporting the visa. Her family have said this was a key step in the success of the peace process in the years that followed. In her brother Ted's memoir, he described that "Jean was convinced that Adams no longer believed that continuing the armed struggle was the way to achieve the IRA's objective of a united Ireland", and that "It took only a couple of hours' conversation with Jean after we landed to discover what was the most important thing on her mind – the opportunity for a breakthrough in the Northern Ireland stalemate". However, Irish Central later acknowledged that President Clinton had, in fact, made a promise during his presidential campaign to grant Adams a visa. Adams also told the BBC in 2019 that Clinton led the Northern Ireland peace process, and that during the peace process, Smith was following advice from west Belfast priest Father Alex Reid, stating: "He [Fr. Reid] was talking to her [Kennedy-Smith] on the side, and she was talking to her brother Teddy [Kennedy]."

In March 1996, Smith was reprimanded by U.S. Secretary of State Warren Christopher for retaliating against two Foreign Service Officers at the Embassy of the United States in Dublin who had objected to her recommendation to the U.S. government to grant Adams the visa and had sent in a "Dissent Channel" message. The Foreign Service Journal called the U.S. State Department's report on the matter "scathingly critical". Her management of the embassy came under criticism by the Boston Herald in December 1996, when she reportedly pressured embassy staff to spend taxpayer money to refurbish her residence in Dublin. Smith was also allegedly to have violated U.S. conflict-of-interest laws. The United States Department of Justice issued a press release on September 22, 2000, announcing that she had paid US$5,000 in a civil settlement to resolve the allegations.

In 1998, Smith took communion in an Irish Protestant cathedral in Dublin, in defiance of her Roman Catholic church.

Awards, and later work

Smith won several awards for her work in Ireland and in the disability community. She was awarded honorary citizenship by the Government of Ireland in 1998. In 2007, Smith received the Gold Medal Award from the Éire Society of Boston for her peace efforts in Northern Ireland and for her humanitarian work with disabled children. In 2009, Smith and Ted Kennedy were honored with the Tipperary Peace Prize for their support of the peace process in Northern Ireland.

In February 2011, President Barack Obama awarded Smith the Presidential Medal of Freedom, the nation's highest civilian honor, for her work with people with disabilities.

On March 15, 2011, Smith was inducted into Irish America magazine's Irish America Hall of Fame.

Smith was listed as Ambassador Jean Kennedy Smith in the credits of the 2012 movie Lincoln for portraying a "woman shouter".

In October 2016, Smith published The Nine of Us: Growing Up Kennedy, a memoir of the Kennedy clan.

Personal life
On May 19, 1956, Jean Kennedy married businessman Stephen Edward Smith in a small chapel of the Roman Catholic St. Patrick's Cathedral, New York. The Smiths maintained a lower profile than some other members of the extended Kennedy family. Stephen and Jean had two biological sons, Stephen, Jr., and William, and later adopted two daughters, Amanda and Kym.

Stephen Edward Smith died of cancer on August 19, 1990. The following year, their younger son William was accused of rape in Florida, but was acquitted after a highly publicized trial.

Smith's elder sister Eunice Kennedy Shriver died on August 11, 2009. Smith did not attend Eunice's funeral on August 14, choosing to stay with their brother Ted, who was terminally ill; he died on August 25, leaving Jean as the last surviving child of Joseph and Rose Kennedy. Smith attended Ted's funeral on August 29.

Smith died at her home in Manhattan on June 17, 2020, at the age of 92; she was the last surviving, and the longest-lived, of the nine Kennedy children.

References

External links
 
 The Kennedy Center: U.S. Ambassador to Ireland, Jean Kennedy Smith
 

1928 births
2020 deaths
Ambassadors of the United States to Ireland
American people of Irish descent
Clinton administration personnel
Convent of the Sacred Heart (NYC) alumni
Kennedy family
Manhattanville College alumni
Massachusetts Democrats
Writers from Brookline, Massachusetts
Presidential Medal of Freedom recipients
Schools of the Sacred Heart alumni
Writers from Boston
Catholics from Massachusetts
American women ambassadors
21st-century American women